Moulvi Muhammad Amiruddin was an Indian politician. He was the first Deputy Speaker of the Assam Legislative Assembly from 7 April 1937 to 2 March 1946.

References 

Assam MLAs 1937–1946
Year of birth missing
Year of death missing